Sora Abdurahmonovna Eshontoʻrayeva (Russified form Sara Ishanturaeva) (— 8 September 1998) was a Soviet and Uzbek actress. She was one of the first actresses of the Uzbek SSR to gain national prominence. She was described as a "pearl of the Uzbek scene".

Early life
After the death of her father when she was very young, her mother gave away her and two of her siblings to be raised by foster parents. In her youth she attended the Zeb-un-Nissa boarding school for girls in Tashkent, where she began acting in plays. When she was only nine years old she had to start wearing a paranja, and later was bethrothed to a neighbor, but she soon abandoned wearing the face-veil and eventually married fellow artist Abror Hidoyatov. 

She left Uzbekistan in 1924 as part of a group of 24 Uzbek theater students chosen to study in Moscow. The students would later form the Hamza Drama Theater. The group returned to Uzbekistan in 1927, where they were in danger of being attacked by religious fanatics for their encouragement of unveiling. Several of Eshontoʻrayeva's colleagues were murdered by religious fanatics, including Tursunoy Saidazimova who was killed when the group was on tour in Bukhara in 1928, followed by the murder of Hamza in Shohimardon in 1929.

Career
Having graduated theater school and relocated to Samarkand in 1927, Eshontoʻrayeva's acting career took off by the 1930s. She played lead roles in major plays, including  Tursunoy in the play Hujum and Beatrice in The Servant of Two Masters. She went on to act as the lead female protagonist in many more productions at the theater, which included both new Uzbek plays by playwrights such as Hamza and Kamil Yashin as well as old classics such as Hamlet by Shakespeare, in which she played the role of Ophelia. From 1946 to 1955 and 1981 to 1985, she served as chairman of the board of the Theater Society of the Uzbek SSR. She also appeared in several films.

In addition to her work as an actress, Eshontoʻrayeva was active in politics. She became a member of the Communist Party in 1939. She was also a member of the Supreme Soviet of the Uzbek SSR, a member of the Central Committee of the Communist Party of the Uzbek SSR, a delegate to the 19th Congress of the Communist Party, and a deputy in the Supreme Soviet of the USSR from the 2nd to 4th convocations (1946 to 1958). She also served as chairman of the board of the Uzbek branch of the Soviet Peace Foundation.

Eshontoʻrayeva died in Tashkent on 8 September 1998 and was buried in the Chigatoy cemetery.

Awards
 People's Artist of the Uzbek SSR (1937)
 People's Artist of the USSR (1951)
 Stalin Prize (1949)
 USSR State Prize (1977)
 Hamza prize (1967)
 Two Order of Lenin (1945 and 1971)
 Order of the October Revolution (1991)
 Order of the Red Banner of Labor (1937, 1950, 1951, 1957, and 1959)
 Order of Friendship of Peoples (1981)
 Order of the Badge of Honor (1939)
 Medal "For Distinguished Labour" (1944)
 Sogʻlom Avlod Uchun Order (1993)
 Order of Outstanding Merit (2004, posthumously)

References

1911 births
1998 deaths
20th-century Uzbekistani actresses
Soviet film actresses
Soviet stage actresses
Uzbekistani film actresses
People's Artists of the USSR
Recipients of the Order of Lenin
Recipients of the Order of the Red Banner of Labour
Recipients of the Order of Friendship of Peoples
Recipients of the USSR State Prize
Stalin Prize winners
Second convocation members of the Supreme Soviet of the Soviet Union
Third convocation members of the Supreme Soviet of the Soviet Union
Fourth convocation members of the Supreme Soviet of the Soviet Union